Bernd Giese (born 2 June 1940) is a German chemist and guest professor in chemistry at the University of Fribourg in Fribourg, Switzerland since 2010.

Biography
Born in Hamburg, Germany, Giese received his PhD from the University of Munich under Rolf Huisgen in 1969. From 1969 to 1971 he worked in pharmaceutical research at BASF in Ludwigshafen. He obtained his Habilitation from the University of Freiburg in 1976. From 1977 to 1988 he was full professor at the Technical University of Darmstadt and from 1989 to 2010 at the University of Basel.

Research
Giese specializes in the bio-organic chemistry and synthesis of radicals in biological systems. He contributed to the understanding of radical induced DNA cleavage and of the DNA synthesis by ribonucleotide reductase. He discovered that long range charge transfer through DNA and Peptides occurs by a hopping mechanism. The formation of carbon–carbon bonds by addition of free radicals to alkenes is called the Giese reaction. Giese developed concepts, guidelines, and synthetic applications for the stereochemistry of radical reactions.

Awards
 1976 Karl-Winnacker Award
 1977 
 1987 Gottfried Wilhelm Leibniz Prize
 1988 Merck-Schuchardt Award
 1999 Member of the German National Academy of Sciences Leopoldina
 2003 Foreign Honorary Member of the American Academy of Arts and Sciences
 2005 Tetrahedron Prize for Creativity in Organic Chemistry & BioMedicinal Chemistry
 2006 Emil Fischer Medal of the Gesellschaft Deutscher Chemiker
 2009 Norris Award in Physical Organic Chemistry of the American Chemical Society
 2012  of the Swiss Chemical Society

Reuters News agency predicted him as a possible Nobel Laureate in Chemistry in 2009.

Notes

References

Further reading

External links
  (Archive)
 
 

1940 births
Fellows of the American Academy of Arts and Sciences
21st-century German chemists
Gottfried Wilhelm Leibniz Prize winners
Living people
BASF people
20th-century German chemists
Scientists from Hamburg